Upper Pontnewydd railway station in Pontnewydd village, Cwmbran in Torfaen, South Wales, UK  was part of the Monmouthshire Railway and Canal Company's Eastern Valley line from Newport to Blaenavon.

History
The station was opened as "Pontnewydd" on 1 July 1852 by the Monmouthshire Railway and Canal Company. It was briefly known as "Upper Cwmbran" from 1 September 1881 until 4 November 1881 when it became "Upper Pontnewydd"; it is not however clear whether the "Upper Cwmbran" name was actually used. Upper Pontnewydd closed to passengers on 30 April 1962 and to goods on 7 April 1969.

The 2-platform station lay to the north of the Commercial Street road bridge, while the goods yard was to the south. Branch sidings served the Redbrook (Tynewydd) and Avondale tin plate works to the north east.

The A4051 Cwmbran Drive, built in the 1980s, largely follows the route of the dismantled railway.

References

Notes

Sources

External links
Pictures and local information
Station on a navigable 1947 O.S. map

Disused railway stations in Torfaen
Railway stations in Great Britain opened in 1852
Railway stations in Great Britain closed in 1962
Former Great Western Railway stations
1852 establishments in Wales
Cwmbran